Montchamp is the name of two communes in France:

Montchamp, Calvados, in the Calvados département 
Montchamp, Cantal, in the Cantal département